Impressions of Phaedra is an album by saxophonist/composer/arranger Oliver Nelson recorded in 1962 and released on the United Artists Jazz label. The album features Nelson's arrangements of Mikis Theodorakis music from the 1962 motion picture Phaedra.

Reception

The Allmusic site awarded the album 2 stars, stating: "Moody and long-forgotten, like the film it was inspired by, Phaedra interchanges film-like cues with some torrid jazz content (mostly courtesy of Phil Woods). Makes an interesting case for 'Greek Jazz.'"

Track listing 
All compositions by Mikis Theodorakis except as indicated
 "Phaedra (Love Theme)" - 3:40
 "London's Fog" - 2:00
 "Dirge" (Oliver Nelson) - 4:50
 "Phaedra (Tragedy)" - 2:20
 "The Fling" - 2:45
 "Rendezvous" - 2:55
 "Too Much Sun" - 2:18
 "One More Time" - 3:22

Personnel 
Oliver Nelson - arranger, conductor
Clark Terry, Bernie Glow, Doc Severinsen, Snooky Young - trumpet
Urbie Green, Paul Faulise, Britt Woodman, Tommy Mitchell - trombone
Don Butterfield - tuba
Phil Woods - alto saxophone
Barry Galbraith - guitar
Lloyd G. Mayers - piano
George Duvivier - bass
Ed Shaughnessy - drums
Ray Barretto - bongos
Unidentified string section

References 

Oliver Nelson albums
1962 albums
Albums produced by Alan Douglas (record producer)
United Artists Records albums